Maurice Louis Baquet (26 May 1911 – 8 July 2005) was a French actor and cellist.

He was born in Villefranche-sur-Saône and died in Noisy-le-Grand.
He studied music at the Conservatoire de Paris in the same class as Henri Betti, Paul Bonneau, Henri Dutilleux and Louiguy.

Partial filmography

 Les Beaux Jours (1935) - Toto
 Veille d'armes (1935)
 The Crime of Monsieur Lange (1936) - Charles, The Concierges' Son
 Helene (1936) - Durant Tout Court
 Girls of Paris (1936) - Gaston
 The Lower Depths (1936) - Alochka - le fou accordéoniste
 Lady Killer (1937) - Le soldat malade
 Ballerina (1937) - Le machiniste
 The Alibi (1937) - Gérard
 Mollenard (1938) - Le Joueur D'Harmonica
 People Who Travel (1938) - (uncredited)
 Altitude 3.200 (1938) - Arthur
 Accord final (1938) - Serge Didot
 Place de la Concorde (1939) - Papillon
 Le Grand Élan (1939) - Boulot
 La Fausse Maîtresse (1942) - Firmin
 The Trump Card (1942) - Mickey
 Frederica (1942) - Un ami de Gilbert
 Départ à zéro (1943) - Colibri
 Le Chant de l'exilé (1943) - Gaspard 'Pas-Béni'
 Goodbye Leonard (1943) - Le marchand de lampions
 First on the Rope (1944) - Boule
 Coup de tête (1944) - Le chef d'orchestre (uncredited)
 The Last Metro (1945) - Henri Remonge
 Lessons in Conduct (1946) - Jean
 Pas un mot à la reine-mère (1947) - Le reporter
 Voyage surprise (1947) - Teddy
 Les Aventures des Pieds-Nickelés (1948) - Ribouldingue
 Kenzi (1948)
 Les souvenirs ne sont pas à vendre (1948) - Rondo
 Le Trésor des Pieds-Nickelés (1950) - Ribouldingue
 Tire au flanc (1950) - Turlot
 Bibi Fricotin (1951) - Bibi Fricotin
 The Dream of Andalusia (1951) - Pepe
 Innocents in Paris (1953)
 L'Impossible Monsieur Pipelet (1955) - Jojo
 A Night at the Moulin Rouge (1957)
 Le Voyage En Ballon (1960) - L'aide
 Mandrin (1962) - Court-Toujours
 Le Prince de Madrid (1967) - Paquito
 Z (1969) - Le maçon héroïque
 Section spéciale (1975) - Marcel Parinet, un secrétaire du Parquet général
 Attention les yeux! (1976) - Un flic
 Monsieur Klein (1976) - Un musicien (uncredited)
 Bobby Deerfield (1977) - (uncredited)
 Jacques Prévert (1977) - Himself
 Fedora (1978) - Cello Player at the Funeral Wake (uncredited)
 The Adolescent (1979) - Jules, le cantonnier
 Le Divorcement (1979) - Le luthier
 Le Roi des cons (1981) - Le patron de l'hôtel de passe
 Madame Claude 2 (1981) - Le professeur de Violoncelle
 Tête à claques (1982) - Le voisin
 Salut... j'arrive! (1982) - L'homme au violoncelle
 The Angel (1982) - Le premier bibliothécaire
 Vive la sociale! (1983) - Monsieur Jo
 Vive les femmes! (1984) - Albert, le patron du café
 Les Rois du gag (1985) - Robert
 Strictement personnel (1985) - Le concierge
 Paulette, la pauvre petite milliardaire (1986) - Le père de Joseph
 Le Débutant (1986) - Maurice
 Roulez jeunesse! (1993) - François
 La Braconne (1993) - Le grand-père
 Délit mineur (1994) - Douchet
 Oui (1995) - Le musicien muet
 Dieu seul me voit (1998) - M. Crémieux

References

External links 
 

1911 births
2005 deaths
People from Villefranche-sur-Saône
Conservatoire de Paris alumni
French classical cellists
French mountain climbers
French male film actors
French male stage actors
French male television actors
20th-century classical musicians
20th-century French musicians
People from Rhône (department)
20th-century cellists